Junction Mall is a shopping centre located at Nungua in the Greater Accra Region of Ghana

History
The Mall was opened on 27 November 2014.

References

Buildings and structures in Accra
Shopping malls established in 2014
Shopping malls in Ghana